The United States circuit courts were the intermediate level courts of the United States federal court system from 1789 until 1912. They were established by the Judiciary Act of 1789, and had trial court jurisdiction over civil suits of diversity jurisdiction and major federal crimes. They also had appellate jurisdiction over the United States district courts.  The Judiciary Act of 1891 (also known as the Evarts Act) transferred their appellate jurisdiction to the newly created United States circuit courts of appeals, which are now known as the United States courts of appeals. On January 1, 1912, the effective date of the Judicial Code of 1911, the circuit courts were abolished, with their remaining trial court jurisdiction transferred to the U.S. district courts.

During the 100 years that the Justices of the U.S. Supreme Court "rode circuit", many justices complained about the effort required. Riding circuit took a great deal of time (about half of the year) and was both physically demanding and dangerous. However, "members of Congress held firm to the belief that circuit riding benefited the justices and the populace, and they turned a deaf ear to the corps of justices that desired to abolish the practice."

The Judiciary Act of 1869 established a separate circuit court (and allowed the hiring of judges specifically to handle the cases) but the act required that Supreme Court justices had to ride circuit once every two years. However, this came to a final end in 1891 when the Circuit Courts of Appeals Act was passed.

Organization
Although the federal judicial districts were grouped into circuits, the circuit courts convened separately in each district and were designated by the name of the district (for example, the "U.S. Circuit Court for the District of Massachusetts"), not by the name or number of the circuit. The designation of circuits served only for the purpose of designating the districts in which a particular Supreme Court Justice, and later a circuit judge, would sit on the circuit court. The circuit court districts were usually, but not always, the same as the districts established for the district courts.

Congress had borrowed the general idea of circuit courts from England, but at their creation, the new United States circuit courts were "a unique institution, whose composition and jurisdiction did not resemble any prior court in England or America."  Each circuit court was composed initially of two Supreme Court justices and the district judge of the district, although in 1793 Congress provided that a quorum of one justice and one district judge could hold court. After 1802, only one justice was assigned to each circuit, and a quorum could consist of a single justice or judge. This "circuit riding" arrangement meant that the Supreme Court justices spent the majority of the year traveling to each district within their circuit to conduct trials, and spent far less time assembled at the capital to hear appeals. The burden of circuit riding was somewhat alleviated by the appointment of circuit judges under the Circuit Judges Act of 1869, but was not abolished until the creation of the intermediate courts of appeals in 1891.

In 1801, Congress attempted for the first time in its history to relieve the Supreme Court justices of this burden by enacting the Judiciary Act of 1801, commonly known as the Midnight Judges Act, but that proved to be highly controversial as the Act took effect with only 19 days remaining in John Adams's Federalist administration.  Before the oppositional Democratic-Republican administration of Thomas Jefferson took power, Adams took advantage of the Act to nominate several new federal judges expected to support the Federalist agenda. Although Jefferson also nominated a few judges, the Act was repealed after only one year because Jefferson feared the judiciary would become too powerful. 

The same act also created the United States Circuit Court of the District of Columbia, a "circuit court" for the District of Columbia. This court had the same original jurisdiction and powers as the United States circuit courts but, unlike those courts, it continued to have its own judges even after the repeal of the Judiciary Act of 1801, and also exercised appellate jurisdiction over justices of the peace and other "local" courts of the District. The District of Columbia was not enumerated among the federal "circuits" at the time. This court was abolished in 1863.

Since each circuit court was initially staffed by sharing judges between the U.S. Supreme Court and each federal district court, the district court clerk usually acted as the circuit court clerk.  This arrangement persisted for many years in most federal judicial districts, even after Congress authorized the appointment of circuit judges in 1869 and allowed such judges to appoint a clerk without the concurrence of the district court judge.

Judges
Although any district court judge could be authorized to act as a circuit judge, only fifty judges solely designated as circuit court judges were ever appointed. These can be broadly categorized into four groups:

 Judges appointed pursuant to the Midnight Judges Act on or after February 20, 1801, and thereafter removed from office with the repeal of that Act on July 1, 1802.
 Judges appointed to the D.C. Circuit, abolished on March 3, 1863
 Judges appointed after 1869 pursuant to the Circuit Judges Act of 1869; those in office on June 16, 1891 were transferred to the newly created United States courts of appeals by operation of law, that is, without action on the part of the President.
 One judge appointed to the California circuit, established in 1855 and abolished on March 3, 1863.

Three circuit court judges, Samuel M. Blatchford, David Josiah Brewer, and William Burnham Woods, were later appointed to the Supreme Court.

Circuit court judges appointed pursuant to the Midnight Judges Act

Judges of the D.C. Circuit

Circuit court judges appointed pursuant to the 1869 Act

Circuit court judge of California

See also
 List of presidents of the United States by judicial appointments

Explanatory notes

References

External links
 Federal Judicial Center

1789 establishments in the United States
1911 disestablishments in the United States
Courts and tribunals disestablished in 1911
Courts and tribunals established in 1789
Circuit court